Mason is a ghost town in Butte County, in the U.S. state of South Dakota.

History
Mason was laid out in 1912, and named in honor of a local family. A post office called Mason was established in 1912, and remained in operation until 1940.

References

Ghost towns in South Dakota
Geography of Butte County, South Dakota